Gábor Reviczky (born March 28, 1949 in Tatabánya) is a Hungarian actor.

Selected filmography
 1985 The Red Countess
 1985 Mata Hari
 1990 Good Evening, Mr. Wallenberg
 1991 Paths of Death and Angels
 1992 The Summer Guest
 1994 Woyzeck
 1997 Dollybirds
 1997 Out of Order
 2001 Glass Tiger
 2015 Liza, the Fox-Fairy

References

External links

1948 births
Living people
Hungarian male film actors